Akanbi Mahmoud Oniyangi (1930 – 17 January 2006) was a Nigerian politician and former Minister for Commerce and Defence during the aborted second republic. He was born in Kwara State and was educated at Ahmadu Bello University, Zaria. He was a lawyer and Community leader before entering politics.

During his tenure as Defence Minister, he tried to the improve Nigeria's strained relationship with its neighbors. Chad was having merger talks with Libya and was under a peacekeeping force and Cameroon was having border disputes with Nigeria.

References

1930 births
2006 deaths
Ahmadu Bello University alumni
People from Kwara State
Yoruba politicians
Defence ministers of Nigeria